Masso is a surname. Notable people with the surname include:

Charlie Masso, (born 1969), Puerto Rican singer and actor
Eduardo Masso (born 1964), Argentina-born Belgian former tennis professional
Edward Masso (born 1955), American businessman and retired United States Navy Rear Admiral
George Masso (1926–2019), American musician
Gildo Massó (1926–2007), Puerto Rican entrepreneur
Jericó Abramo Masso, Mexican politician
John Masso (1932–2003), Australian priest
Jorge Massó (born 1950), Cuban former footballer
Liudys Masso, Cuban paralympian
Luca Masso (born 1994), Argentine field hockey player
Maykel Massó, (born 1999), Cuban long jumper
Valjo Masso (1933–2013), Estonian agronomist and politician

See also 

 Massa (surname)
 Masso (disambiguation)